Paul Oskar Lindberget (6 August 1895 – 10 February 1983) was a Norwegian politician for the Labour Party.

He was born in Hof.

He was elected to the Norwegian Parliament from Hedmark in 1950, and was re-elected on two occasions. He had previously served in the position of deputy representative during the term 1945–1949.

Lindberget was a member of Våler municipality council from 1934 to 1941, and served as deputy mayor in the period 1945–1947.

References

1895 births
1983 deaths
Labour Party (Norway) politicians
Members of the Storting
20th-century Norwegian politicians